is a 2012 Japanese animated fantasy action film and the first based on the shōnen manga and anime series Fairy Tail by Hiro Mashima. It was directed by Masaya Fujimori, and its screenplay was written by anime staff writer Masashi Sogo, while Mashima was involved as the film's story planner. Tetsuya Kakihara, Aya Hirano, Rie Kugimiya, Yuichi Nakamura, Sayaka Ōhara, Satomi Satō, and Yui Horie reprise their character roles from the anime series. The film also features Aya Endō as the titular priestess Éclair, and Mika Kanai as her birdlike companion Momon. The first film was released in Japan on August 18, 2012, and on Blu-ray and DVD in North America on December 10, 2013.

A sequel, titled Fairy Tail: Dragon Cry, was released in May 6, 2017.

Plot

During a raid on Fire Village, local priestess Éclair flees with one half of her village's mystical Phoenix Stone before passing out. In Magnolia, Fairy Tail wizard Lucy Heartfilia spots Éclair collapsing on the city streets while returning from a mission. After bringing Éclair and her birdlike companion Momon to her guildhall, Lucy introduces them to her friends Natsu Dragneel, Happy, Gray Fullbuster, Erza Scarlet, Wendy Marvell, and Carla. Hearing a vision from Carla, Éclair embarks on a journey to the monster-filled Boundary Forest. Éclair expresses contempt for magic and wizards, but Lucy and her friends persuade her to let them accompany her.

Suffering from amnesia, Éclair remembers that she must bring her stone half to Kalard, a wizard living in Boundary Forest. Along the way, the group encounters Chase, a wizard from the Carbuncle guild recruited by Duke Cream, the vain ruler of the neighboring country of Veronica, to capture Éclair. The group eventually finds the remains of Kalard's house and realizes he has died. Through a holographic message, Kalard reveals himself to be Éclair's father and tells her of a spell he created to dispel the stone's cursed magic. Lucy bonds with Éclair after revealing the death of her own father, Jude, convincing Éclair to implore Fairy Tail to fulfill her father's final request.

After the wizards return to Magnolia, Fairy Tail's guildhall is attacked by Carbuncle's leader Dist and his subordinates – Chase, Cannon, and Coordinator – who capture Éclair. Fairy Tail's master Makarov Dreyar and guildmates Gajeel Redfox and Panther Lily warn the guild that Cream plans to combine Éclair's stone with the other half in his possession to summon a phoenix that will grant him immortality. Lucy's team goes to Veronica along with Gajeel, Lily, and Juvia Lockser to rescue Éclair, defeating Dist's henchmen there.

Cream combines the two stones and prepares to burn Éclair as a sacrifice in the town square, where Éclair recognizes a phoenix-shaped idol from her village and regains her memories. Momon rescues Éclair, but is immolated. As Cream summons the phoenix, Dist throws him aside to attain immortality for himself. The "phoenix" appears in the form of a giant, non-avian monster and begins destroying everything around itself as Dist climbs on its back to obtain its immortality-granting blood. Natsu knocks him off the phoenix, but the monster continues its assault and begins absorbing the wizards' magic for a final, cataclysmic attack.

Éclair reveals herself to Lucy to be over 400 years old, having become immortal by drinking the phoenix's blood to survive the destruction of the Fire Village, which is now Veronica. Makarov and the rest of Fairy Tail arrive with an arrow created by Kalard and taken from the Magic Council to destroy the Phoenix Stone. However, Makarov explains that doing so would kill Éclair along with the phoenix. To Lucy's dismay, Éclair accepts her fate as Natsu and Erza use the arrow to destroy the stone inside the phoenix's eye. Éclair's body disappears with the phoenix, and her spirit reunites with Momon's as they ascend to the sky. In the aftermath, Veronica is rebuilt, Carbuncle's members are captured, the Fairy Tail wizards repair their guildhall, and Lucy smiles as she spots a young Éclair's spirit among the townsfolk.

Cast

Music
The film's soundtrack was composed and arranged by Yasuharu Takanashi. It was released on August 18, 2012 on Pony Canyon. The film's opening theme is "200 miles" by Jang Keun-suk.

Release
The film received a limited release in 73 Japanese theaters on August 18, 2012. Advance tickets were bundled with the 30-page manga  drawn by Hiro Mashima to promote the film. It opened in 9th place at the Japanese box office, and received the highest per-screen average of any film shown that weekend. It held a top ten position until its second week. The film's DVD was bundled with a special edition release of Volume 36 of the manga on February 13, 2013, and included an animated adaptation of The Sunrise as a bonus extra. In Southeast Asia, the film was aired on Animax Asia on March 23, 2013 as The Phoenix Priestess. Funimation Entertainment licensed the film for a North American release in both English subtitled and dubbed versions, with The Sunrise (retitled The First Morning) exclusively in Japanese with English subtitles. The movie dub was screened at Nan Desu Kan on September 13, 2013, and was released on Blu-ray and DVD on December 10, 2013.

Reception
Fairy Tail the Movie: Phoenix Priestess received positive reviews from critics and viewers, receiving an average of "4 out of 5 stars" from fans on Japan Yahoo! Movies. Travis Bruno of Capsule Computers gave the film a score of 8.5 out of 10, praising the development of the characters Lucy and Éclair, and favoring the film's faster paced action sequences over the anime series' use of CGI magic circles. However, he criticized the animation for having "nosedives in mid-distance shots". Bruno was also critical towards the timing of the film's North American release with that of the anime, feeling that the movie's placement after the time skip in Fairy Tail'''s storyline would confuse viewers who only followed the English release of the anime up until then.

Kyle Mills of DVD Talk described the movie as "a great one off story that is well developed and fantastically executed", distinguishing it from "typical" shōnen films with "little real development". He also praised the English dub cast, singling out Jessica Calvello and Todd Haberkorn as giving "standout" performances as Éclair and Natsu, respectively. Mills felt that the character designs looked "off" compared to the anime series, but added that it "shouldn't detract, since the film still looks better than your standard episode from the series". On the DVD's bonus features, Mills noted the lack of an English dub for The First Morning short, calling it "an odd choice". Raymond Herrera of Examiner.com called the film "more of the same", but opined that he found little else wrong with it.

Carl Kimlinger of Anime News Network'' called the film "a compact, 85-minute action confection with all the heart and humor one associates with Hiro Mashima's manga and none of the bloat and apathy one associates with its TV adaptation". However, he considered the English dub to be "stoically, unenthusiastically professional", criticizing Cherami Leigh and Calvello's performances, but calling Haberkorn's "toned-down" Natsu "a relief".

References

External links
  (Archived) 
  
 

2012 anime films
A-1 Pictures
Anime films based on manga
Fairy Tail
Funimation
2010s Japanese-language films
Japanese animated films
Films scored by Yasuharu Takanashi